Scottsboro Municipal Airport , also known as Word Field, is a city-owned public-use airport located two nautical miles (3.7 km) northeast of the central business district of Scottsboro, a city in Jackson County, Alabama, United States. According to the FAA's National Plan of Integrated Airport Systems for 2009–2013, it is categorized as a general aviation facility.

Facilities and aircraft 
It has one runway designated 4/22 with an asphalt surface measuring 5,250 by 80 feet (1,600 x 24 m).

For the 12-month period ending May 12, 2009, the airport had 7,745 aircraft operations, an average of 21 per day, all general aviation. At that time there were 40 aircraft based at this airport: 82.5% single-engine, 2.5% multi-engine and 15% ultralight.

References

External links 
 Aerial image as of 26 March 1998 from USGS The National Map
 Airfield photos for 4A6 from Civil Air Patrol
 

Airports in Alabama
Transportation buildings and structures in Jackson County, Alabama